Kherson River Port is a large transport hub in which there is interaction of river, sea, rail and road transport. Kherson River Port was born at the same time as the city (1778). Initially, the first shipments from the upper reaches of the Dnieper came for those who built a fortress and shipyard. In 1946 the Kherson River Port received the status of the Kherson River Port.

See also
Battle of Kherson
Kherson
Port of Kherson
List of ports in Ukraine
Cargo turnover of Ukrainian ports

References

Companies established in 1778
River ports of Ukraine
1778 establishments in Ukraine
Ports of Kherson Oblast